Élisabeth Alexandrine de Bourbon (Élisabeth Thérèse Alexandrine; 5 September 1705 – 15 April 1765) was a French princess of the blood and a daughter of Louis III, Prince of Condé. Her father was the grandson of the Grand Condé and her mother, Madame la Duchesse, the eldest surviving daughter of Louis XIV of France and his maîtresse-en-titre, Madame de Montespan.

Biography

Early life
Élisabeth Alexandrine was born in Paris on 5 September 1705, as was one of nine children and her parents' youngest daughter. Named in honour of her older sister Louise Élisabeth and her uncle Louis Alexandre de Bourbon (Count of Toulouse), she was known by her second name of Alexandrine.

From birth, she was known at court as Mademoiselle de Gex but would later take on the courtesy title of Mademoiselle de Sens. She was known as Mlle de Sens most of her life. As a princesse du sang, Alexandrine was addressed with the style of Her Serene Highness.

Like most of her sisters, she would never marry. She was considered as a possible bride for her older cousin, Louis d'Orléans, but her aunt, the proud Duchess of Orléans, wanted a more prestigious bride for her son. In 1725, she as well as her sister Henriette-Louise was among the women suggested by her brother, the then Prime minister, as queen of France by marriage to Louis XV. She was one of the final four seriously considered candidates when the original list of 99 princesses was first reduced to seventeen and then to four, leaving her and her sister alongside Anne, Princess Royal and Princess of Orange and Princess Amelia of Great Britain as the final alternatives—and when the two British princesses was removed from the list because of religious issues, she and her sister were the only two remaining candidates. Her brother the Prime minister finally recommended her sister Henriette before her, because he considered Henriette to be more attractive than Alexandrine. In the end, her sister was also refused and Maria Leszczyńska, one the candidates removed when the list was reduced to 17, was chosen instead.

Adult life

Élisabeth Alexandrine was never to play a very prominent political role. She was, however, a great friend of the king's mistress, the famous Madame de Pompadour, who had been introduced at court by Alexandrine's older sister and namesake, Louise Élisabeth.

Like her older sister, Louise Anne, she owned much land and many private residences outside of the capital. In 1734, she bought the Hôtel de Noirmoutier on the rue de Grenelles in Paris. She also bought much land surrounding the hôtel and considerably enlarged the property. In 1744, she bought the estates and lordships of Villegénis and Igny. She remodelled the Château de Villegénis in 1755.   The cost of the remodelling was 430,000 livres. To raise that sum, she sold the estate and seigneurie of Vallery, the traditional burial place of the Condé family, to M. and Mme. de Launay, for 280,000 livres.  François Desportes, painter of the king's hunts, supplied large canvases for the appartements.

By the time of her death, she had accumulated a large fortune from the old pensions originally assigned to her cousin, Mademoiselle du Maine (1707–1743), the daughter of Louis Auguste, Duke of Maine and his wife, the famous salon hostess Louise Bénédicte de Bourbon.  Élisabeth Alexandrine died in Paris on 15 April 1765, at the age of 59. Her nephew, Louis Joseph de Bourbon, Prince of Condé, was her heir. She was buried at the Carmelite Convent of the Faubourg Saint-Jacques in Paris.

Ancestry

References

Elisabeth Alexandrine
18th-century French people
1705 births
1765 deaths
Burials at the Carmel du faubourg Saint-Jacques
Nobility from Paris
Elisabeth Alexandrine
18th-century landowners